Gordi (also Romanized as Gordī; also known as Garmī and Gordī-ye Dīzgarān) is a village in Harasam Rural District, Homeyl District, Eslamabad-e Gharb County, Kermanshah Province, Iran. At the 2006 census, its population was 100, in 24 families.

References 

Populated places in Eslamabad-e Gharb County